Edward James Turns (born 18 October 2002) is a professional footballer who plays as a centre-back for Leyton Orient, on loan from Premier League side Brighton & Hove Albion and the Wales under-21 national team.

Club career
Turns debuted for the Brighton first-team in a 2–0 EFL Cup win over Swansea City on 22 September 2021. He was involved in a Premier League matchday squad for the first time on 15 December, remaining as an unused substitute in the 1–0 home loss against Wolverhampton Wanderers.

On 13 January 2023, Turns signed for EFL League Two club Leyton Orient on loan until the end of the season. He made his debut for The O's the next day, playing in his first ever professional league game where he picked up a yellow card in the 0–0 home draw against Barrow. 
Turns scored his first professional goal on 7 February, opening the scoreline in the 2–0 away win over Crewe. Four days later, he scored again, scoring the equaliser, earning Leyton Orient a point in the 1–1 away draw at Walsall.

International career
Turns was called up to the Wales under-21 squad in March 2022 for the 2023 European under-21 Championship qualifying matches against Switzerland and Bulgaria. He made his debut for the Young Dragons almost three months later on 11 June, playing the whole match of the 1–0 home defeat against the Netherlands in a Euro qualifier.

Career statistics

References

External links

2002 births
Living people
Footballers from Brighton
English footballers
Welsh footballers
Wales under-21 international footballers
English people of Welsh descent
Association football defenders
Brighton & Hove Albion F.C. players
Leyton Orient F.C. players